Macasinia minifurcata is a species of moth of the family Tortricidae. It is found in Carchi Province, Ecuador.

The wingspan is 16-17.5 mm. The ground colour of the forewings is brownish creamy, but darker in the basal half of the wing. The hindwings are creamy brownish, but darker in the distal half.

References

Moths described in 2002
Cochylini